Husbands, Wives & Lovers is an American television sitcom that aired for only one season on CBS in 1978. Created by Joan Rivers, this program focused on the relationships of five suburban couples living in the San Fernando Valley.

Cast and characters

 Harry Bellini (Eddie Barth), a blue-collar self-made man who owns a fleet of garbage trucks.
 Lennie Bellini (Mark Lonow), Harry's brother, who runs a jeans boutique.
 Rita DeLatorre (Randee Heller), Lennie's lover, who co-runs the boutique.
 Ron Willis (Ron Rifkin), a dentist who's separated from his wife.
 Helene Willis (Jesse Welles), Ron's wife.
 Joy Bellini (Lynne Marie Stewart)
 Paula Zuckerman (Cynthia Harris)
 Murray Zuckerman (Stephen Pearlman), a traveling salesman who spends a lot of time on the road.
 Dixon Carter Fielding (Charles Siebert), Helene's stuffy divorce lawyer.
 Courtney Fielding  Claudette Nevins, Dixon's free-spending wife.

Episode list

References
 

1970s American sitcoms
1978 American television series debuts
1978 American television series endings
Television shows set in California
CBS original programming
Television series by 20th Century Fox Television